Harold Matthew Spinka Jr. (April 2, 1945, Chicago – December 27, 2020, Naperville, Illinois) was an American physicist, specializing in experimental particle physics.

Biography
He graduated in 1966 with a bachelor's degree from Northwestern University and in 1970 with a Ph.D. in physics from California Institute of Technology (Caltech). His doctoral dissertation The 16O + 16O reaction was supervised by Thomas Anthony Tombrello (1936–2014). From to 1970 to 1973 Spinka was a postdoctoral fellow at Argonne National Laboratory. In February 1973 he married Katherine Marie Wick (1950–2012). From 1973 to 1976 he was an adjunct assistant professor at UCLA (University of California, Los Angeles). His wife graduated from UCLA in 1976 with a Ph.D. in anatomy.

After resigning from UCLA, he returned to Argonne National Laboratory, where he spent his career as a physicist, senior physicist, and research associate. One of his mentors and close friends was Akihiko Yokosawa (1927–2009). From 1983 to 1986 Spinka was a member of the progressive advisory committee of the Los Alamos Meson Physics Facility (LAMPF), renamed in 1995 the Los Alamos Neutron Science Center (LANSCE). He is known for his research on dibaryon resonances, the spin structure of the proton studied using the Relativistic Heavy Ion Collider (RHIC) at Brookhaven National Laboratory, and the Dark Energy Survey (DES) relating to the identification of supernova candidates. He also did important work involving the Zero Gradient Synchrotron (ZGS) and the Alternating Gradient Synchrotron (AGS).

In 2007 Spinka was elected a fellow of the American Physical Society for "his contributions to spin physics and leadership of symmetry experiments at ZGS, LAMPF, AGS, and RHIC."

He participated in competitive swimming until the age of 73. He enjoyed working with students and often served as a judge at science fairs. Upon his death he was survived by a daughter, a son, and five grandchildren.

Selected publications
 
 
 
  (over 650 citations)
 
 
 
 
 
 
  (over 350 citations)

References

1945 births
2020 deaths
20th-century American physicists
21st-century American physicists
Particle physicists
Northwestern University alumni
California Institute of Technology alumni
Argonne National Laboratory people
Fellows of the American Physical Society
People from Chicago